Fado is a genre of Portuguese song

Fado may also refer to:

Ireland
"Fadó fadó", long long ago in Irish

Film
Fados (film), 2007 Portuguese film directed by Carlos Saura
Fado (character), The Legend of Zelda: The Wind Waker
Fado (character), Fire Emblem: The Sacred Stones

Literature
Fado Alexandrino, a novel by Portuguese author António Lobo Antunes

Music
Fado (Carminho album)
Fado, album by Mísia 1993
Fado, album by Katia Guerreiro
Fado Curvo, album by Mariza
Fado em Mim, 2002 album by Mariza
Fado Tradicional, 2010 album by Mariza

Acronym
FADO, computer documentation system